Commander Nigel David "Sharkey" MacCartan-Ward,  (born 1943), born Nigel David Ward, is a retired British Royal Navy officer who introduced the Sea Harrier Fighter, Reconnaissance, Strike aircraft to service and commanded 801 Naval Air Squadron during the Falklands War. He was known as Mr. Sea Harrier.

Early life
Sharkey was brought into the world as Nigel David Ward on 22 September 1943 in Medicine Hat, Alberta, Canada where his RAF father was serving. (He changed his surname by deed poll in the early 90s to MacCartan-Ward after his father’s death and in honor of the latter’s Irish ancestry.) He traveled to the UK in 1944 with his mother and elder brother - a five-week journey by sea, avoiding the U-boat threat. He was stricken with bronchiectasis and hospitalized for a year at the age of 5, and only survived the disease by spending 3 years in the dry climate of Pakistan at RAF Mauripur, Karachi. After a return to England, he was educated as a boarder at Reading School, Berkshire (1954-1962) where he became Head Boy and Captain of the 1st XV Rugby Team (and also a South of England Rugby Trialist.) He learned to fly with an RAF Flying Scholarship in 1959, earning his Private Pilot’s Licence in the Tiger Moth.

Military career
After basic flying training he completed his training with the Fleet Air Arm on the Hawker Hunter and Sea Vixen. He then worked as a nuclear planning officer at NATO Allied Forces Northern Europe. In 1974 he returned to 892 Phantom Squadron on HMS Ark Royal as the Senior Pilot before becoming the Sea Harrier Desk Officer in the Ministry of Defence. In 1979, he took command of the Sea Harrier FRS.1 Intensive Flying Trials Unit at 700 Naval Air Squadron. Ward featured in an episode of Pebble Mill at One that year when he landed a Sea Harrier in a sports field next to the Pebble Mill Studios.

Royal Navy Career - as a Seaman Career Officer

In 1962, he entered Britannia Royal Naval College as a Naval Cadet on the General List.
In 1963-64, he served as a Midshipman in the Bahamas Patrol frigate, HMS Tartar before returning to the College as a Sub-Lieutenant. He was put in charge of the Dartmouth Tiger Moth Flying Club and appointed Divisional Sub-Lieutenant of Exmouth Division. On leaving Dartmouth, the Commander of the College, John Ford, commented that “Never has a Division been run so well from a horizontal position!”
In 1965-66, as a Lieutenant, he was appointed Navigator of the Hong Kong Guardships, HMS Penston and Woolaston. During this period, he achieved his Bridge Watch Keeping and Ocean Navigation Certificates and qualified as a Ship’s Diver.

Royal Navy Career - Flying Training

Sharkey’s military flying training began in 1966 and continued until 1969. When passing out from Basic Flying Training, flying the Jet Provost at RAF Linton-on-Ouse, he won the Aerobatics Trophy and the Lord Mayor’s Sash for Best Student. His Advanced and Tactical Flying Training took place at Royal Naval Air Station Brawdy in South Wales where he flew the Hunter fast jet aircraft. His follow-on Operational Flying Training took place at Royal Naval Air Station Yeovilton in Somerset where he flew the frontline fighter aircraft, the Sea Vixen Mk.2 and where he was awarded the Kelly Memorial Trophy and Admiral Sir Dudley Pound Prize for Best Operational Student. He was then appointed to the Phantom Training Squadron, 767 NAS and to 892 frontline Phantom F-4K Squadron in continuation.

Royal Navy Career - in the Frontline with the Fleet Air Arm

Sharkey carried out his first deck-landing in HMS Ark Royal IV on 14 June 1970. He qualified as an All-Weather Fighter Pilot by Day and Night. He then qualified as an Instrument Rating Instructor in 1971 and an Air Warfare Instructor in 1972.
From 1972 to 1974, he carried out a NATO Aviation Staff job as Nuclear Intelligence and Planning Officer at Allied Forces Northern Europe (AFNORTH), Oslo, Norway under the command of General Sir Peter Whitely, Royal Marines. Whilst there, he drafted: the Mine Warfare Policy for AFNORTH; the Plans for the nuclear destruction of the Soviet Amphibious Fleet; and helped draft a new “Graduated Response” Nuclear Policy for the Supreme Allied Commander Europe (SACEUR) to replace the existing “Tripwire” Policy, which was accepted.
On return to the UK, he was appointed as the Senior Pilot of 892 Squadron and strove successfully to enhance the night deck landing and air-to-air combat confidence and capability of all his 14 pilots (including himself).
His 2nd embarked frontline tour ended in 1976 when he was appointed to serve in the Ministry of Defence as the Officer in charge of the Sea Harrier FRS Mk 1, the P3T Sea Eagle Sea-Skimming Missile and the AIM-120B AMRAAM Projects. By 1979, the Sea Harrier was ready to enter service, on cost and on time. He was then appointed to be the Commanding Officer of the Sea Harrier Intensive Flying Trials Unit, 700A Squadron, was ordered to write his own Terms of Reference and, with an excellent team of aviators and engineers, was relied upon entirely to prepare the aircraft and all its personnel for full operational readiness. In 1980, he was appointed to Command the Headquarters Squadron, 899, in continuation and, in 1981, was given Command of 801 frontline Squadron based in HMS Invincible and was promoted to Commander (by which time he had become well known as “Mister Sea Harrier”).

Falklands War
During Operation Corporate, the Falklands War, he was Senior Sea Harrier advisor to the Command on all aspects of the fast jet air-to-air war. 

From commanding 700A Trials Squadron through to 801 Squadron, Ward had prepared the Sea Harrier world well for action in the South Atlantic. Two additional aircraft and pilots were borrowed from the conversion unit, 899 Naval Air Squadron, and with a strength of eight aircraft and eleven pilots they embarked in HMS Invincible on 3 April 1982.

21 May 1982
Ward, flying Sea Harrier XZ451/006, was leading a division of three aircraft launched to carry out combat air patrol over the Falkland Sound, southwest of San Carlos Water. Two Pucara ground-attack aircraft operating from Goose Green at low level were detected by the air defence controller in HMS Brilliant. The three Sea Harriers were in the climb en route Invincible when they were vectored towards the Pucaras. One of the Pucaras was attacked from abeam by the two Sea Harriers flown by  Steve Thomas and Alisdair Craig but evaded being hit. Simultaneously, Ward  attacked Major Carlos Tomba's aircraft from behind with his ADEN cannon, setting the starboard engine on fire and damaging the port aileron. He immediately re-attacked hitting the fuselage and port engine. In his third and final run flying as low as 10 feet above the ground, he destroyed the cockpit canopy and upper fuselage. Tomba ejected from the Pucara at very low-level before the aircraft crashed north-west of Drone Hill. Tomba was unhurt and walked back to Goose Green.

Later that same day Ward, in Sea Harrier ZA175, and his wingman, Steve Thomas, were carrying out a low-level combat air patrol to the west of San Carlos over the land. Whilst in a turn, Ward sighted two Argentine Air Force Mirage V "Daggers" approaching from the west at very low level. They were on their way to attack the landing force in San Carlos Water. He flew between them head on and then turned hard to engage them in combat. The Daggers also turned hard but not towards their target. They were running for home. This placed them in front of Steve's Sea Harrier and he shot them down with two AIM-9L Sidewinder missiles. Meanwhile, a third unseen Dagger was firing its cannon from behind Ward's aircraft at him but missed. Ward turned on the Dagger and shot him down with a Sidewinder. Whist this dog fight was going on, a fourth Dagger had evaded intercept and had attacked the air defence control ship Brilliant: fortunately with little damage. The three Dagger pilots, Major Piuma, Captain Donadille and Lieutenant Senn, ejected safely.

1 June 1982
Ward, in Sea Harrier XZ451, and Steve Thomas were in the climb returning to Invincible after combat air patrol when they were alerted by HMS Minerva to an intermittent radar contact 40 miles to the northwest. Ward immediately led his wingman in a hard turn towards the reported contact position and detected a large aircraft target on his Blue Fox radar, at 38 miles and 4,000 feet below. He immediately took charge of the intercept and tracked the target turning towards Argentina and descending. At high speed, the two Sea Harriers closed in on the target and, as he emerged through the low cloud, Ward became visual with a four-engined Lockheed C-130 Hercules transport aircraft at 200 feet above the sea. Short of fuel for the return to Invincible, immediate action was required. Ward's first Sidewinder missile fell just short of the C-130, but the second started a fire between the inner and outer starboard engines. Ward then fired 240 rounds from his Harrier's two ADEN cannons and this action caused the enemy aircraft to lose control, sending it crashing into the sea and killing the seven crew members.

Ward flew over sixty war missions, achieved three air-to-air kills, and took part in or witnessed a total of ten kills; he was also the leading night pilot.
During the War, he was awarded the Air Force Cross for Services to Harrier Aviation and then, after the war, he was decorated with the Distinguished Service Cross for Gallantry.
Having returned to the UK, he received the Freedom of the City of London, became a Member of the Royal Aeronautical Society and achieved 1st place at Greenwich Staff College, receiving the Director’s Prize. He then served in the Ministry of Defence as the Air Warfare and Air Weapons Adviser to the Naval Staff and the First Sea Lord before voluntarily retiring from the Navy in 1985.

Later life
After retiring from the Royal Navy in 1985 Ward wrote the book Sea Harrier Over the Falklands: A Maverick at War, first published in 1992. In 2001, he returned to the RNAS Yeovilton to fly with his son Kris, after the younger Ward qualified to fly the Sea Harrier FA2. His son died 15 November 2018, aged 45.

In 2011, while residing in Grenada, he had a radio interview with Ezequiel Martel, son of the C-130 Hercules pilot shot down by Ward during the conflict.

Falklands-related Accolades

1976. One of his Phantom pilots: “Sharkey, you might be a crazy bastard, but if we ever go to war, I want it to be with you!”

Postwar
First Sea Lord, Admiral Sir Henry Leach:
“Without the Sea Harrier there could have been no Falklands war.”

Admiral Sir “Sandy” Woodward GBE KCB, Commander of the Carrier Battle Group, Falklands 1982: “If Sharkey Ward had not disobeyed orders, we would/could not have won the Falklands war.”

Admiral Sir Jeremy Black GBE KCB DSO, Captain of HMS Invincible in the Falklands:
“While everyone on board played a significant role, not least 820 squadron with nine Sea Kings – they flew the equivalent of once around the world often in appalling weather without the loss of an aircraft – it must be 801 Squadron, the Sea Harriers, who take the ship’s honours for the campaign. This small body of men, under Lieutenant Commander ‘Sharkey’ Ward, faced the enemy at close range. They had been reinforced by some aircraft of 899 squadron. They shot down nine aircraft, of which Sharkey shot down three, including a Hercules transport.”

Admiral Sir Derek Roy Reffel KCB, Flag Officer Flotilla 3, who signaled: “No other ship has contributed so much to the success of the Task Force group operations [as Invincible].”

Major-General Julian Thompson CB OBE, Brigadier commanding 3 Commando Brigade in the Falklands: “Sharkey Ward’s book [Sea Harrier over the Falklands] will come as a revelation to anyone who thinks that a fighter pilot’s prelude to battle is a matter of kicking the tires, lighting the fires and heading for the wide blue yonder. Painstaking preparation of his squadron, superlative personal flying skills, and a determination to engage the enemy more closely, made Sharkey Ward a fighter leader in the mould of Bader, Johnson, Ball and others in the past.
To those of us who day after day watched the air attacks on the ships in San Carlos, the best news was the number of Argentine aircraft splashed after each raid. As the Sea Harriers whittled down the enemy, so our admiration for the Fleet air arm increased. Without them we would not have won.”
Prime Minister, Margaret Thatcher: “Sharkey Ward is one of the 6 most important Names of the Falklands war.”

A private message to Sharkey from one of his squadron maintenance engineers: “Sharkey, we would gladly have died for you.”

Honours and awards
12 June 1982 – Air Force Cross for services to VSTOL aviation in the Queen's Birthday Honours.
8 October 1982 – Distinguished Service Cross for gallant and distinguished service in the South Atlantic:
November 1982. Awarded Freedom of the City of London.

Beyond the Falklands

1985:  Managing Director of Defence Analysts Limited:
Consultant to British Aerospace and Ferranti Radar;

Provided Security Services to an international range of Clients including Petroleum Pipeline of Panama and the Thai Government;

Provided onboard Safety, Defence and Emergency Operators for Oil Tankers and Special Cargo Vessels in the Arabian Gulf during the Iran /Iraq War. Saved many ships and many lives;

Working with UK Government politicians and Scientific Advisers to set up a Fishery Protection Service for the Sierra Leone Government.  Drew up all the plans and procedures and raised financial support from Citibank to the tune of ₤17 million.  Political troubles within Sierra Leone and neighboring Liberia eventually prevented the Project from proceeding.

1998 to 2018.
Since the turn of the century, Sharkey has worked hand-in-glove with Admiral Sir Sandy Woodward (RIP) to address the vital needs of UK’s Strategic Maritime Policy - with particular emphasis on providing Naval Air Warfare and Aircraft Carrier Operations Expertise to the Ministry of Defence and associated Government Committees.

Works

References
Notes

Bibliography
Burden/Draper/Rough/Smith & Wilton, Falklands – The Air War. London: Arms & Armour Press. 1986.

External links
 Imperial War Museum (IWM):

Living people
1943 births
Royal Navy officers
Fleet Air Arm aviators
Recipients of the Distinguished Service Cross (United Kingdom)
Royal Navy personnel of the Falklands War
Recipients of the Air Force Cross (United Kingdom)
People educated at Reading School